Azteca brevis is a species of ant in the genus Azteca. Described by Auguste-Henri Forel in 1899, the species is endemic to Costa Rica and Nicaragua.

References

Azteca (genus)
Hymenoptera of North America
Insects described in 1899